The 1923 Ice Hockey European Championship was the eighth edition of the ice hockey tournament for European countries associated to the International Ice Hockey Federation .  
 
The tournament was played between March 7, and March 11, 1923, in Antwerp, Belgium, and was won by Sweden.

Results

March 7

March 8

March 9

March 10

March 11

Final standings

Top Goalscorer

Léon Quaglia (France), 10 goals

References
 Euro Championship 1923

  
1923
Ice Hockey European Championships
Sports competitions in Antwerp
1920s in Antwerp
March 1923 sports events